"Hands-on" refers to human interaction, often with technology. It implies active participation in a direct and practical way.

Hands-on or Hands-On may refer to:

 Hands-on computing, a branch of human-computer interaction (HCI) research
 Hands-on-throttle-and-stick (HOTAS)
 Hands-On Electronics magazine
 Hands-On Mobile company
 Global Hands-On Universe project
Hands-on management style

See also 
 The Hands-On Guide for Science Communicators book
 Ann Arbor Hands-On Museum, a US science museum
 Hands On USA, a relief project for Hurricane Katrina